Estadio Nacional de Fútbol Pedro Marrero, the former home of CF Ciudad de La Habana, is a multi-purpose stadium in Havana, Cuba.  It is now used primarily for football matches.  The stadium holds 30,000 and was built in 1929.

History
Originally named Gran Stadium Cervecería Tropical (or familiarly, La Tropical), it hosted the 1937 Bacardi Bowl and many Cuban League baseball games.  After the revolution, it was renamed for Pedro Marrero, a young man who died in the attack on the Moncada Barracks.

Geography
The stadium is located in the ward of Ceiba, part of the municipal borough of Playa; next to the borders with Nuevo Vedado, borough of Plaza de la Revolución.

See also
Estadio Panamericano
Estadio Latinoamericano

References

External links

Football venues in Cuba
Sports venues in Havana
Multi-purpose stadiums
Defunct college football venues
1929 establishments in Cuba
Sports venues completed in 1929
American football venues in North America
20th-century architecture in Cuba